The second season of the American television series Haven premiered on July 15, 2011, on Syfy. The season consisted of 13 episodes including a Christmas episode. The show stars Emily Rose, Lucas Bryant and Eric Balfour.

Cast

Main cast
 Emily Rose as Audrey Parker / Sarah Vernon
 Lucas Bryant as Nathan Wuornos
 Eric Balfour as Duke Crocker

Recurring cast
 Richard Donat as Vince Teagues
 John Dunsworth as Dave Teagues
 Jason Priestley as Chris Brody
 Vinessa Antoine as Evidence "Evi" Ryan
 Kathleen Munroe as FBI Agent Audrey Parker
 Stephen McHattie as Ed Driscoll
 Edge (credited as WWE Superstar Edge) as Dwight Hendrickson

Guest stars
 Maurice Dean Wint as Agent Byron Howard
 Cristián de la Fuente as Cornell Stamoran
 Dylan Neal as Hugh Underwood
 Torrance Coombs as Kyle Hopkins
 Tahmoh Penikett as Simon Crocker
 Nicholas Campbell as Garland Wuornos
 Brodie Chaisson  as Snipper Thug

Episodes

Production
On October 7, 2010, Syfy announced that Haven would begin production on a thirteen-episode second season to begin airing July 15, 2011. On March 22, 2011, SyFy announced that they would air a Christmas special of Haven during season two. 

Jason Priestley directed the ninth episode and guest starred in a four-episode arc as Chris Brody, a handsome but anti-social marine biologist who is forced to deal with an affliction most would consider a blessing. Vinessa Antoine had a recurring role as Evidence "Evi" Ryan, a former con-artist and Duke's estranged wife. 

Syfy premiered the season premiere at San Diego Comic Con during the network's screening panel two months prior to its premiere date.

Adam "Edge" Copeland guest starred as Dwight Hendrickson, a shrewd longtime Haven resident and a former Army Ranger felled by a supernatural affliction in Afghanistan who puts his tactical skills to use in Haven as the mysterious "Cleaner." Originally going to be a guest, Copeland was instead promoted to recurring after his role was expanded to four episodes. Cristián de la Fuente also guest starred as Cornell, a straight-laced, conservative, mild-mannered banker who is hiding a dark and shocking double life.

Season 2 also included the stand-alone Christmas episode "Silent Night" which was later included in the DVD/Blu-ray release as a bonus feature. However, that release omitted the Teagues' narration.

Home media release

References

External links 
 
 List of Haven episodes at The Futon Critic
 List of Haven episodes at MSN TV

2011 American television seasons
2